Sottrum is a municipality in the district of Rotenburg, in Lower Saxony, Germany. It is situated approximately 11 km west of Rotenburg, and 30 km east of Bremen.

Sottrum belonged to the Prince-Bishopric of Verden, established in 1180. In 1648 the Prince-Bishopric was transformed into the Principality of Verden, which was first ruled in personal union by the Swedish Crown - interrupted by a Danish occupation (1712–1715) - and from 1715 on by the Hanoverian Crown. The Kingdom of Hanover incorporated the Principality in a real union and the Princely territory, including Sottrum, became part of the new Stade Region, established in 1823.

Sottrum is also the seat of the Samtgemeinde ("collective municipality") Sottrum.

References